Onyx Pharmaceuticals  Inc. has been a biopharmaceutical company headquartered in South San Francisco, California. The company developed and marketed medicines for the treatment of cancer. Onyx was founded in 1992 by Kevin J. Kinsella and Frank McCormick Ph.D., FRS.  McCormick served as the chief scientific officer until 1998, while Kinsella was the firm's chairman.  In 2009, the company acquired Proteolix, Inc., a private biotechnology company, for $276 million in cash plus additional milestone payments.  In January 2012, the company was named "the top biotechnology takeover target in 2012" through an industry survey. Onyx president and chief executive officer (CEO) Tony Coles had said that Onyx liked its prospects as an independent company and was focused on bringing new therapies to patients.  However, at the end of August 2013, Amgen announced it was acquiring Onyx in an agreed $10.4 billion deal.

Initial funding for the formation of Onyx came from biotechnology firm Chiron Corporation (granted a 43% stake in the new company) and venture capital investors:  Avalon Ventures, Institutional Venture Partners, J. H. Whitney & Company, and Kleiner Perkins Caufield & Byers.  McCormick had been working on cancer treatments at Chiron before he was selected as vice president of research at the newly formed company, leading the company's research program.  The acting president of the firm at its inception was Samuel D. Colella, a partner at Institutional Venture Partners (an original Onyx backer).

Products and development
Sorafenib, co-developed and co-marketed with Bayer and sold under the trade name Nexavar, is a drug approved in the United States for the treatment of advanced renal cell carcinoma (kidney cancer) in 2005, and for the treatment of inoperable hepatocellular carcinoma, the most common form of liver cancer, in 2007.  Sorafenib has also been evaluated in other types of cancer, including those of the thyroid (as a treatment of last resort) and breast (in comparison to capecitabine).

Carfilzomib (marketed under the trade name Kyprolis) was approved by the FDA on June 20, 2012, for use in patients with multiple myeloma who have received at least two prior therapies, including treatment with bortezomib and an immunomodulatory therapy, and have demonstrated disease progression on or within 60 days of completion of the last therapy. Carfilzomib is also being evaluated in other stages of multiple myeloma. The most commonly reported adverse reactions (incidence ≥ 30%) are fatigue, anemia, nausea, thrombocytopenia, dyspnea, diarrhea, and pyrexia.

Regorafenib (marketed under the trade name Stivarga), is currently being studied as a potential treatment option in multiple tumor types.  On 27 September 2012, the FDA approved regorafenib for the treatment of patients with metastatic colorectal cancer (CRC) who have been previously treated with fluoropyrimidine-, oxaliplatin, and irinotecan-based chemotherapy, an anti-VEGF therapy, and, if KRAS wild-type, an anti-EGFR therapy.  On February 25, 2013, the FDA approved regorafenib in a second indication to treat patients with locally advanced, unresectable or metastatic gastrointestinal stromal tumor (GIST) who have been previously treated with imatinib mesylate and sunitinib malate.  Regorafenib is a compound developed by Bayer. The most common adverse reactions (>/=20%) are asthenia/fatigue, HFSR, diarrhea, decreased appetite/food intake, hypertension, mucositis, dysphonia, and infection, pain (not otherwise specified), decreased weight, gastrointestinal and abdominal pain, rash, fever, and nausea.  In 2011, Bayer entered into an agreement with Onyx under which Onyx will receive a 20 percent royalty on any future global net sales of regorafenib in oncology. Bayer and Onyx jointly promote Stivarga in the United States.

In June 2013, Amgen Inc offered to buy the shares of Onyx Pharmaceuticals for $120 per share, sending the shares up by around 30% after the news was announced. Onyx announced on June 30, 2013, that it rejected the unsolicited proposal from Amgen. The Onyx board has authorized its financial adviser to contact potential suitors. The acquisition was formally announced on 25 August 2013.

In July 2014 the company announced the phase III failure of a Sorafenib-Capecitabine combination trial. The drug combination failed to increase progression free survival of patients with advanced breast cancer.

References

External links
 
 
 

Companies based in San Francisco
Companies formerly listed on the Nasdaq
Orphan drug companies
Life sciences industry
1992 establishments in California
American companies established in 1992
Pharmaceutical companies established in 1992